Sympycnodes uptoni is a species of moth of the family Cossidae. It is found in Australia, where it has been recorded from northern Western Australia.

The wingspan is 27–42 mm for males. The forewings are pale grey with fine brown strigulae (fine streaks), scattered brown scales and two dark brown spots surrounded by white. The hindwings are white with darker veins and brown scales.

Etymology
The species is named in honour of Murray Upton who collected the type series.

References

Moths described in 2012
Zeuzerinae